Constituent Assembly elections were held in El Salvador in January 1944, however, no results were posted.

References

Bibliography
Anderson, Thomas P. Matanza: El Salvador's communist revolt of 1932. Lincoln: University of Nebraska Press. 1971.
Krehm, William. Democracia y tiranias en el Caribe. Buenos Aires: Editorial Parnaso. 1957.
Political Handbook of the world, 1944. New York, 1945.

Legislative elections in El Salvador
El Salvador
1944 in El Salvador
Election and referendum articles with incomplete results